William Francis Brace (26 August 1926, Littleton, New Hampshire – 2 May 2012) was an American geophysicist.

Career

Education 
Brace matriculated in 1943 at Massachusetts Institute of Technology (MIT), and after 1944–1946 service in the Navy, graduated with bachelor's degrees in 1946 in naval architecture and in 1949 in civil engineering. In 1953 he received his PhD from MIT's department of geology and geophysics. In 1953–1954 he was a Fulbright scholar at Bruno Sander's laboratory in Austria.

Work at MIT 
In 1955 he became an assistant professor at MIT and was from 1976 to 1981 MIT's Cecil and Ida Green Professor of Geology, retiring in 1988 as professor emeritus. From 1981 to 1988 he was the head of MIT's Department of Earth, Atmospheric and Planetary Sciences. At MIT he established a school of quantitative geological rock formation; this school is associated with results such as Byerlee's Law and Brace-Goetze Strength Profiles.

Retirement 
In his retirement, among other activities, Brace undertook the study of grasses and sedges, particularly in Concord, Massachusetts. Over the course of eight years he documented six sedge species (five of them native) and seven grass species new to Concord.

Honors 
Brace was a Guggenheim Fellow for the academic year 1960–1961. He was elected in 1953 a Fellow of the Geological Society of America, in 1963 a Fellow of the American Geophysical Society, and in 1971 a Fellow of the American Academy of Arts and Sciences. In 1971 he was elected a member of the National Academy of Sciences. In 1987 he received the Bucher Medal of the American Geophysical Union and the Distinguished Achievement Award from the U.S. National Committee on Rock Mechanics. MIT established the William F. Brace Lecture Series in his honor.

Selected publications
 with Chris Goetze: Laboratory observations of high temperature rheology of rocks, Tectonophysics, 13, 1972, 583-600 
 with David Kohlstedt: Limits on lithospheric stress imposed by laboratory experiments, J. Geophys. Res., 85, 1980, 6248-6252 
 with J. D. Byerlee: Stick-slip as a mechanism for earthquakes, Science, vol. 153, 1966, 990-992 
 with Byerlee: Stick-slip, stable sliding and earthquakes—Effect of rock type, pressure, strain rate and stiffness, J. Geophys. Res., 73, 1968, 6031-6037 
 with R. M. Stesky, D. Riley, P.-Y. Robin: Friction in faulted rock at high temperature and pressure, Tectonophysics, 23, 1974, 177-203 
 with Stesky: Estimation of frictional stress in the San Andreas fault from laboratory measurements, in R. L. Kovach, A. Nur (eds.) Proc. Conf. on the tectonic problems of the San Andreas fault, Stanford University Publ. Geolog. Sci., 12, 1973, 206-214

References

American geophysicists
American geologists
MIT School of Engineering alumni
Massachusetts Institute of Technology School of Science faculty
Members of the United States National Academy of Sciences
1926 births
2012 deaths